The amphibians of Hispaniola are diverse.

Species

Bufonidae 
Order: Anura. 
Family: Bufonidae

Bufo fractus
Bufo guentheri
Peltophryne fluviatica
Peltophryne fracta
Peltophryne guentheri
Rhinella marina

Eleutherodactylidae 
Order: Anura. 
Family: Eleutherodactylidae

Eleutherodactylus abbotti
Eleutherodactylus alcoae
Eleutherodactylus amadeus
Eleutherodactylus aporostegus
Eleutherodactylus apostates
Eleutherodactylus armstrongi
Eleutherodactylus audanti
Eleutherodactylus auriculatoides
Eleutherodactylus bakeri
Eleutherodactylus bothroboans
Eleutherodactylus brevirostris
Eleutherodactylus caribe
Eleutherodactylus chlorophenax
Eleutherodactylus coqui
Eleutherodactylus corona
Eleutherodactylus counouspeus
Eleutherodactylus darlingtoni
Eleutherodactylus diplasius
Eleutherodactylus dolomedes
Eleutherodactylus eunaster
Eleutherodactylus flavescens
Eleutherodactylus fowleri
Eleutherodactylus furcyensis
Eleutherodactylus glandulifer
Eleutherodactylus glanduliferoides
Eleutherodactylus glaphycompus
Eleutherodactylus grahami
Eleutherodactylus haitianus
Eleutherodactylus heminota
Eleutherodactylus hypostenor
Eleutherodactylus inoptatus
Eleutherodactylus jugans
Eleutherodactylus lamprotes
Eleutherodactylus leoncei
Eleutherodactylus limbensis
Eleutherodactylus lucioi
Eleutherodactylus melatrigonum
Eleutherodactylus minutus
Eleutherodactylus montanus
Eleutherodactylus nortoni
Eleutherodactylus notidodes
Eleutherodactylus oxyrhyncus
Eleutherodactylus parabates
Eleutherodactylus paralius
Eleutherodactylus parapelates
Eleutherodactylus patriciae
Eleutherodactylus paulsoni
Eleutherodactylus pictissimus
Eleutherodactylus pituinus
Eleutherodactylus poolei
Eleutherodactylus probolaeus
Eleutherodactylus rhodesi
Eleutherodactylus rucillensis
Eleutherodactylus rufifemoralis
Eleutherodactylus ruthae
Eleutherodactylus schmidti
Eleutherodactylus sciagraphus
Eleutherodactylus semipalmatus
Eleutherodactylus sommeri
Eleutherodactylus thorectes
Eleutherodactylus tychathrous
Eleutherodactylus ventrilineatus
Eleutherodactylus warreni
Eleutherodactylus weinlandi
Eleutherodactylus wetmorei

Hylidae 
Order: Anura. 
Family: Hylidae

Hypsiboas heilprini
Osteopilus dominicensis
Osteopilus pulchrilineatus
Osteopilus vastus

Leptodactylidae 
Order: Anura. 
Family: Leptodactylidae 

Leptodactylus albilabris

Ranidae 
Order: Anura. 
Family: Ranidae

Rana catesbeiana

Hispaniola
Amphibians
Hispaniola